Loston Harris is an American jazz pianist and vocalist. Harris plays primarily from the Great American Songbook in a traditional style. He is a regular performer at various venues in New York City including Jazz at Lincoln Center, has recorded five albums, and appeared in a feature film.

Biography

Loston Harris began his studies at Virginia Commonwealth University as a percussion major. After hearing Harris playing the piano, visiting professor Ellis Marsalis urged the percussionist to switch instruments. Harris later transferred to Howard University where he studied piano with Geri Allen and Billy Taylor.

In 1995 Harris toured with Wynton Marsalis, and in 1996 with Marcus Roberts. He has released five albums, the most recent in 2013. Additionally, he appeared as himself in the 2005 film Little Manhattan. Harris currently leads the house band at the Carlyle Hotel’s Bemelmans Bar.

Discography

Stepping Stones (1996)
Comes Love (1998)
Timeless (2003)
Why Try to Change Me Now? (2010)
Swingfully Yours (2013)

External links
 Official website
 Yanow, Scott. “Loston Harris Biography.” Allmusic

Year of birth missing (living people)
Living people
Virginia Commonwealth University alumni